Shudhu Ekbar Bolo is a 1999 Bengali film directed by Prabhat Roy and produced by  Dr. D. Ramanaidu. The film features actors Prosenjit Chatterjee and Rituparna Sengupta in the lead roles. The music of the film has been composed by Babul Bose. The film is a remake of the Telugu film Pellichesukundam. The movie revolves around the plight of a molested woman and her rehabilitation.

Cast 
 Prosenjit Chatterjee
 Rituparna Sengupta
 Deepankar De
 Mouli Ganguly
 Tota Roy Chowdhury
 Subhasish Mukhopadhyay
 Mrinal Mukherjee
 Alakananda Dasgupta
 Ramen Raychowdhury

Music
The film has musical score by Babul Bose.

References 

1999 films
Bengali-language Indian films
Bengali remakes of Telugu films
1990s Bengali-language films
Films scored by Babul Bose